Kışlaköy (literally "barracks village" in Turkish) may refer to the following places in Turkey:

 Kışlaköy, Araç
 Kışlaköy, Bartın
 Kışlaköy, Elmalı
 Kışlaköy, Mut
 Kışlaköy, Narman
 Kışlaköy, Sungurlu

See also
Kışla (disambiguation)